WKDR (1490 AM) is an American radio station licensed to serve the community of Berlin, New Hampshire. The station went on the air in August 2009 as a simulcast of co-owned WXXS Lancaster. In summer 2010, the station began simulcasting 93.7 WOTX and added a broadcast translator W257CP/99.3 FM.

Translator

References

External links

KDR
Coös County, New Hampshire
Radio stations established in 2009
Berlin, New Hampshire